Rešetar, Rešetár, or Resetar may refer to:

 Dominik Rešetar (born 2000), Croatian footballer
 Eric Resetar (1928–2011), New Zealand cartoonist
 Lukáš Rešetár (born 1984), Czech futsal player
 Milan Rešetar (1860–1942), Serb-Croatian linguist

See also
 

Czech-language surnames
Croatian surnames
Serbian surnames